A parish in Dobele Municipality, Latvia; which exists in two parts. It was in the former Jelgava District.

Prior to 2010 it was known as the countryside territory of the town of Auce.

Towns, villages and settlements of Vecauce parish 
  - parish administrative center

References

External links

Parishes of Latvia
Dobele Municipality
Semigallia